Overlook Restaurant was a restaurant in Portland, Oregon, United States, operated by Jim and Jane Sassalos since 1974. The restaurant closed in January 2018.

Description and history
Overlook Restaurant was located at 1332 North Skidmore, near the intersection of North Skidmore and Interstate, in Portland's Overlook neighborhood. It had been operated by Jim and Jane Sassalos since 1974.

In 2016, rumors began circulating that the restaurant would be closing. The Sassaloses initially denied immediate plans to close, but conceded, "Our business, per se, is not up for sale, but do they think we can just go on forever? At some point we have to have an end game. Wouldn't you if you were 80?" In March, documents filed with the Bureau of Development Services showed signs of the restaurant being replaced by an apartment complex.

See also
 List of defunct restaurants of the United States

References

External links
 

1974 establishments in Oregon
2018 disestablishments in Oregon
Defunct restaurants in Portland, Oregon
Overlook, Portland, Oregon
Restaurants established in 1974
Restaurants disestablished in 2018